The Inspector of State Prisons was a statewide elective office created by the New York State Constitution of 1846. At the 1847 New York state election, three Inspectors were elected and then, upon taking office, so classified that henceforth every year one Inspector would be elected to a three-year term. The Prison Inspectors appointed wardens and keepers and supervised the prison administration in general. They were required to visit jointly four times a year each one of the state prisons. Besides, each one of the Inspectors was allotted the special care to one of the then existing three state prisons (Auburn State Prison, Sing Sing State Prison and Clinton State Prison) where he had to attend to business for at least one week per month.

In 1876, a constitutional amendment abolished the office of State Prison Inspector, pending the appointment of a New York Superintendent of State Prisons who would take over the duties of the Prison Inspectors. The first Superintendent was Louis D. Pilsbury, appointed by Governor Lucius Robinson on February 17, 1877.

List of Inspectors of State Prisons

References

Further reading
The New York Civil List compiled by Franklin Benjamin Hough (pages 45f; Weed, Parsons and Co., 1858)
The New York Civil List compiled by Franklin Benjamin Hough, Stephen C. Hutchins and Edgar Albert Werner (1867; pages 410f)

History of New York (state)
Prisons in New York (state)
State constitutional officers of New York (state)
1848 establishments in New York (state)
1877 disestablishments in New York (state)